Niels Bach Kristensen (born 24 April 1988) is a retired Danish professional football midfielder, who used to play for  Danish Superliga side AGF Aarhus. He was forced to retire due to a knee injury in January 2010.

References

External links
National team profile
Official Danish league statistics

1988 births
Living people
Danish men's footballers
Viby IF players
Aarhus Gymnastikforening players
Danish Superliga players
Association football midfielders